Keiseromyia is a genus of true crane fly.

Distribution
Madagascar

Species
K. polyphragma Alexander, 1963

References

Tipulidae
Diptera of Africa